Heriberto Jara may refer to:

General Heriberto Jara International Airport located at Veracruz, Mexico
Heriberto Jara Corona, Mexican politician.